José Bernárdez (1 October 1935 – 12 March 2018) was a Spanish racing cyclist. He rode in the 1964 Tour de France and in five editions of the Vuelta a España. He also finished fourth in the road race at the 1961 UCI Road World Championships.

Major results
1961
 1st Gran Premio de Llodio
 2nd GP Ayutamiento de Bilbao
 4th Road race, UCI Road World Championships
1962
 8th Overall Critérium du Dauphiné Libéré
 8th Overall Euskal Bizikleta

References

External links
 

1935 births
2018 deaths
Spanish male cyclists
Sportspeople from Santiago de Compostela
Cyclists from Galicia (Spain)